The West Coast Get Down is an American jazz collective formed in Los Angeles in 2006. Its members include saxophonist Kamasi Washington, bassists Miles Mosley and  Stephen "Thundercat" Bruner, drummers Ronald Bruner Jr. and Tony Austin, pianists Cameron Graves and Brandon Coleman, trombonist Ryan Porter, and multi-instrumentalist Terrace Martin. Most of the members of the group gained prominence for their contributions to Kendrick Lamar's critically acclaimed album To Pimp a Butterfly (2015).

Described as the "Wu-Tang Clan of jazz," the collective has been hailed for "revitalizing jazz for younger audiences."

History

1993–2009: Origins 

Each member of the collective grew up in Los Angeles County. Though they attended different high schools, they were first brought together in 1993 thanks to Locke High School music educator Reggie Andrews, who led an extracurricular music ensemble in Watts called the Multi-School Jazz Band; and Barbara Sealy and Robert Brodhead, who raised funds for Andrews after-school programs through the Thelonious Monk Institute of Jazz. Members of this band include Kamasi Washington (saxophone), brothers Stephen Bruner (bass) and Ronald Bruner Jr. (drums),  Miles Mosley (bass), Tony Austin (drums), Brandon Coleman (keyboard), Cameron Graves (piano), and Ryan Porter (trombone).

As high schoolers, the group held some of their jam sessions in Washington's garage studio, affectionately dubbed "the Shack." and at after-school programs and gigs around the City of LA, procured and produced by Andrews and Sealy. The larger group began performing at jazz clubs throughout Los Angeles after graduation, including at the World Stage, an African-American arts space in Leimert Park founded by jazz drummer Billy Higgins, and at the coffee shop 5th Street Dick's. 

The group, occasionally joined by vocalist Patrice Quinn, also had a residency at the Piano Bar, a Hollywood bar venue that became the group's home after Mosley created a space for them to perform when they were back off the road from their various tours. In 2008, Mosley led the twice-weekly performing residency at the Piano Bar that would last eight years until the space closed in 2016. The West Coast Get Down collective was officially established at the Piano Bar in 2009, with Mosley as its founder.

2010–2015: Later collaborations 

In December 2011, the West Coast Get Down rented studio space at Kingsize Soundlabs in Echo Park, where they recorded for 30 straight days from 9a.m. to 2a.m., sometimes sleeping in the studio, in what came to be known as the "KSL Sessions." With Tony Austin doubling as the studio engineer, they recorded around 190 songs, many of which later appeared on albums including Washington's Brainfeeder release The Epic (2015), Mosley's Uprising (2017), Ronald Bruner's Triumph (2017), Graves's Planetary Prince (2017),  Coleman's Resistance (2018), and Mosley and Austin's joint project BFI (2014). While productive, these sessions were taxing for the musicians, with Mosley recounting, "It was, creatively, the most freeing thing I've ever been a part of, but as a human being, it was really hard." Porter has said, "Those sessions are a blur, honestly, but I just remember us approaching that music so cinematically."

In 2013, rapper Kendrick Lamar, who had been friends with Terrace Martin since 2005, enlisted Martin to work on his upcoming album To Pimp a Butterfly. Martin later tapped Washington to provide string arrangements and saxophone parts. Miles Mosley and Ronald Bruner Jr. also participated in the album's recording sessions. To Pimp a Butterfly was released in 2015 to widespread critical acclaim, garnering 11 nominations and five wins at the 58th Grammy Awards. It is regarded as one of the greatest hip hop albums of all time.

2016–present: After To Pimp a Butterfly 

Before the Piano Bar closed in 2016, the West Coast Get Down played one of the venue's closing performances, a "secret show" with little advertisement. Members of the group have since pursued their own projects and tours, often alongside some subset of the collective. Regarding the future of the collective, Ronald Bruner Jr. said in 2020, "Being in this band is a gig forever. I could be 90 and Kamasi will still call me!" Washington said the group has discussed creating an album under the West Coast Get Down moniker sometime in the future.

Members 

 Miles Mosley – upright bass & vocals
 Kamasi Washington – tenor saxophone
 Ryan Porter – trombone
 Tony Austin – drums
 Ronald Bruner Jr. – drums
 Cameron Graves – piano
 Brandon Coleman – keyboards
 Thundercat – electric bass
 Terrace Martin – alto saxophone, keyboards
 Patrice Quinn – background vocals

Discography 

The West Coast Get Down has been noted for their contributions to the following albums:

References 

American jazz ensembles
American jazz ensembles from California
Musical collectives